The Evans-Bevan Baronetcy, of Cadoxton-juxta-Neath in the County of Glamorgan, is a title in the Baronetage of the United Kingdom. It was created on 9 July 1958 for the Welsh businessman David Evans-Bevan. As of 2010 the title is held by his son, the second Baronet, who succeeded in 1973.

Evans-Bevan baronets, of Cadoxton-juxta-Neath (1958)
 Sir David Martyn Evans-Bevan, 1st Baronet (1902–1973)
 Sir Martyn Evan Evans-Bevan, 2nd Baronet (born 1932)

See also
 Margam Castle

Notes

References
 Kidd, Charles, Williamson, David (editors). Debrett's Peerage and Baronetage (1990 edition). New York: St Martin's Press, 1990, 
 

Evans-Bevan